UĦM Voice of the Workers is a Maltese trades union which organises staff in health and social care.  It changed its name from Union Ħaddiema Magħqudin in 2015.

Only 45% of the Maltese workforce is unionised. The union advocates mandatory trade union membership for low income workers.  It also campaigns against outsourcing.

It supported a doctors strike against the transfer of hospitals to Steward Global Healthcare and a dispute by public healthcare pharmacists demanding  better training opportunities, both happening during January 2018.

References

Public sector trade unions
Trade unions in Malta